Dhysores is a genus of beetles in the family Carabidae. It is confined to Africa.

Species
There are seven species:
 Dhysores basilewskyi (Brinck, 1965)
 Dhysores biimpressus R.T. Bell & J.R. Bell, 1985
 Dhysores liber R.T. Bell & J.R. Bell, 1979
 Dhysores pan R.T. Bell & J.R. Bell, 1979
 Dhysores quadriimpressus (Grouvelle, 1910)
 Dhysores rhodesianus (Brinck, 1965)
 Dhysores thoreyi (Grouvelle, 1903)

References

Rhysodinae
Carabidae genera
Beetles of Africa